A by-election was held for the New South Wales Legislative Assembly electorate of The Hawkesbury on 7 April 1877 because William Piddington had been appointed Colonial Treasurer in the second Parkes ministry. Such ministerial by-elections were usually uncontested and on this occasion, The Hawkesbury was the only district at which the re-election of a minister was opposed.

Dates

Results

William Piddington had been appointed Colonial Treasurer in the second Parkes ministry.

See also
Electoral results for the district of Hawkesbury
List of New South Wales state by-elections

Notes

References

1877 elections in Australia
New South Wales state by-elections
1870s in New South Wales